A cantor is one who leads a religious group, or perhaps others, in singing.

Music 
 Cantor (Christianity), the chief singer, and usually instructor, employed at a church, a cathedral or monastery with responsibilities for the ecclesiastical choir and the preparation of liturgy.
 Hazzan, Jewish cantor
 Cantor (music software), a vocal singing synthesizer software

Mathematics 
 Georg Cantor (1845–1918), German mathematician
 Cantor cube
 Cantor distribution
 Cantor function
 Cantor medal, German mathematics prize named after Georg Cantor
 Cantor set or Cantor dust
 Cantor space

Science and technology 
 16246 Cantor, asteroid
 Cantor (crater), a lunar crater
 Cantor (software), a free software mathematics application for scientific statistics and analysis
 Cantor (taxonomy), auctor name
 Cantor, a trade name for Minaprine

Other 
 Cantor (surname)